Kmehin (lit. truffle) is a secular moshav in the western Negev desert in Israel. Located near Nitzana, it falls under the jurisdiction of Ramat HaNegev Regional Council.

History
The moshav was founded in 1988 and was named for the truffles that grow in the area.

The moshav's main produce is cherry tomatoes, flowers, spices and peppers.

References

External links
Kmehin Negev Information Centre

Moshavim
Populated places in Southern District (Israel)
Populated places established in 1988
1988 establishments in Israel